Dimitrios Kolovos (born 1940) is a Greek former swimmer. He competed in the men's 100 metre backstroke at the 1960 Summer Olympics, where he was eliminated in the heats.

References

1940 births
Living people
Greek male swimmers
Olympic swimmers of Greece
Swimmers at the 1960 Summer Olympics
Swimmers from Athens
Male backstroke swimmers